Pillar Point, also known in Chinese as Mong Hau Shek is a coastal area of Tuen Mun Town (Tuen Mun), Tuen Mun District, in the New Territories, Hong Kong.

Pillar Point is located west of the Butterfly Bay, south of the hill Castle Peak, east of Tap Shek Kok and north of Urmston Road.

History
Pillar Point was the site of the Pillar Point Vietnamese Refugees Centre (PPVRC), the last Vietnamese refugee camp in activity in Hong Kong. It closed on 31 May 2000.

See also
 River Trade Terminal

References

Tuen Mun